Bear Creek is a northern settlement in  northwest Saskatchewan located on Highway 155. This community of 47 people is midway between the towns of Buffalo Narrows to the south and La Loche to the north. It is near the junction of Highway 909 that leads to Turnor Lake to the east. The chairman of this northern settlement is Dean Herman. The northern settlement is an unincorporated community in the Northern Saskatchewan Administration District.

The community is located on Bear Creek which flows south from Linvall Lake and Palmbere Lake to Peter Pond Lake.

Another Bear Creek was once located in the Qu'Appelle District of southern Saskatchewan. It had a post office which opened on June 10, 1935 and closed on June 15, 1963.

History 
After Highway 155 was built in the 1960s several families from La Loche built homes there.

Demographics 

See also 
 List of communities in Northern Saskatchewan
 List of communities in Saskatchewan

References 

Designated places in Saskatchewan
Division No. 18, Unorganized, Saskatchewan
Northern settlements in Saskatchewan